Srđan Golović (born 22 March 1967) is a Montenegro football manager and former player.

Playing career

Club
Born in Podgorica, known as Titograd back then and capital of SR Montenegro, SFR Yugoslavia, he started his career at OFK Titograd where, after playing in the youth teams, he debuted as senior and played there till 1989 when he joined FK Budućnost Titograd and played with them between 1989 and 1991 in the Yugoslav First League. He then played with FK Rudar Pljevlja, FK Obilić, FK Čukarički and FK Radnički Niš before moving to Hungary where he played with MTK Budapest FC and Győri ETO FC in the Nemzeti Bajnokság I between 2000 and 2002.

Managerial career
After retiring, he stayed at Čukarički, coaching youth levels in the club. He holds UEFA A coaching licence, and between 2005 and 2009 he has worked with the first team of Čukarički. By Autumn 2016 he was the coach of the youth section of FK Sinđelić Beograd.

References

1967 births
Living people
Footballers from Podgorica
Association football midfielders
Yugoslav footballers
Serbia and Montenegro footballers
OFK Titograd players
FK Budućnost Podgorica players
FK Rudar Pljevlja players
FK Obilić players
FK Čukarički players
FK Radnički Niš players
MTK Budapest FC players
Győri ETO FC players
Yugoslav First League players
Second League of Serbia and Montenegro players
First League of Serbia and Montenegro players
Nemzeti Bajnokság I players
Serbia and Montenegro expatriate footballers
Expatriate footballers in Hungary
Serbia and Montenegro expatriate sportspeople in Hungary
Montenegrin football managers
FK Čukarički managers
Expatriate football managers in Serbia
Montenegrin expatriate sportspeople in Serbia